
The Byblos Fossil Museum (aka Memory of Time) is a museum in Byblos, Lebanon. This museum contains fossil collections of sharks, eels, shrimps, squids, rays, coelacanthes and flying fish. It was opened in 1991 and is in the old souk of Byblos. Most of its collection comes from the nearby villages of Haqel-Byblos, Hjula, and Ennammoura.

Bony fish fossils
Some of the bony fish fossil genera that can be seen at the museum are: Apateopholis, Belonostomus, the cephalopod genera, Coccodus, and Ctenothrissa.

See also
 List of prehistoric bony fish

References

External links
 Memory of Time — Official website 

1991 establishments in Lebanon
Museums established in 1991
Museums in Lebanon
Fossil museums
Byblos
Paleontology in Lebanon